Ernest Joseph Fazio (January 25, 1942 – December 1, 2017) was an American professional baseball second baseman. He played in Major League Baseball (MLB) for the Houston Colt .45s (1962–63) and Kansas City Athletics (1966).

Fazio signed with the Colt .45s and split his first professional season, between Houston's first-ever National League team and its Triple-A affiliate, the Oklahoma City 89ers. In , he was able to play in 102 games for Houston by filling in at second base, third base and shortstop. He hit both of his major league home runs in that year, off lefthanders Denny Lemaster and Hall of Famer Warren Spahn of the Milwaukee Braves.

After the  season, he was the "player to be named later" in an earlier trade that sent Houston pitcher Jesse Hickman to the Athletics for slugger Jim Gentile. Despite his small stature, Fazio had shown power that year by hitting 23 home runs for Oklahoma City. He played in 27 games for the Athletics as a backup infielder during the  season. Fazio's brother – John Richina started and coached Oakland Dynamites Pop Warner, Oakland, CA & managed Babe Ruth Baseball

All told, Fazio appeared in 141 MLB games, and garnered 50 hits in 274 at bats.

References

External links
Baseball-Reference.com

1942 births
2017 deaths
All-American college baseball players
Baseball players from Oakland, California
Hawaii Islanders players
Houston Colt .45s players
Iowa Oaks players
Kansas City Athletics players
Major League Baseball second basemen
Major League Baseball shortstops
Major League Baseball third basemen
Oklahoma City 89ers players
Santa Clara Broncos baseball players
Vancouver Mounties players